was a town located in Saeki District, Hiroshima Prefecture, Japan.

On November 1, 2004, Nōmi, along with the towns of Ōgaki and Okimi (all from Saeki District), and the former town of Etajima (from Aki District), was merged to create the city of Etajima and no longer exists as an independent municipality.

As of 2003, the town had an estimated population of 5,979 and a density of 360.62 persons per km². The total area was 16.58 km².

External links
 Official website of Etajima 

Dissolved municipalities of Hiroshima Prefecture